Juan Antonio Ocampo Silva (born 11 June 1989) is a Mexican former football player who last played as a defender.

International career

Mexico U-20
Ocampo was capped twice for the Mexico U-20 squad, during the 2009 CONCACAF U-20 Championship held in Trinidad and Tobago.

References

External links

1989 births
Living people
Sportspeople from Tepic, Nayarit
Footballers from Nayarit
C.D. Guadalajara footballers
Querétaro F.C. footballers
Dorados de Sinaloa footballers
Tecos F.C. footballers
Liga MX players
Mexican footballers
Association football defenders
2009 CONCACAF U-20 Championship players